50M2 is a 2021 Turkish thriller and drama streaming television series directed by Selçuk Aydemir, written by Burak Aksak, and starring Engin Öztürk, Aybüke Pusat and Cengiz Bozkurt. The show was released on Netflix on 27 January 2021, consisting of one season for a total of 8 episodes.

Plot 
The plot tells the story of a hitman named Gölge (transl: Shadow) who is trying to find his identity. Gölge works for a man named Servet Nadir and wants to know what happened to his parents. Servet knows the truth, but refuses to tell Gölge as it was Servet who killed Gölge's parents. Servet tries his best to keep the truth hidden but is unable to stop Gölge, who has found a source claiming to know his family. Servet hires an assassin to kill Gölge, but Gölge manages to fight the assassin off. A bystander is shot in the crossfire.

Gölge then stumbles on a tailor shop whose owner died. He pretends to be Adem Yilmaz, the son of the tailor, Adil, who has just recently died, in order to keep himself hidden from Servet. He meets new people along the way and states that he is the deceased tailor's son as a cover. A man named Yakup grows suspicious of Adem and begins to poke into his history despite being told by everyone that he is Adil's son.

Servet continues to search for Gölge. Gölge begins to have visions of what happened and at first he believes that he murdered his own parents. The next night he begins to remember more of his past. He slowly remembers that Servet had a part in his parents' death. He helps the people when Servet tries to steal their houses in a suspicious land deal. He finally helps them regain their houses and drives the mob presence away.

Yakup, on the other hand, comes across a woman who knows Adem and he brings her to the tailor shop. She realizes right away that it is not Adem and they have a conversation. Gölge tells her that Adem is safe when in reality he was the bystander shot dead during the crossfire at the house.

Yakup drops the search into Gölge's life after he is saved from a mystery assassin that attacked him. Gölge then confronts Servet in his penthouse and they share a drink. Gölge soon feels dizzy as the drink was laced; he holds his gun, threatening Servet to tell the truth, and Servet also holds a gun to Gölge. The show cuts to black as a gunshot is heard. It is unclear who fired first.

Cast 
 Engin Öztürk - Adem/Shadow
 Aybüke Pusat - Dilara
 Cengiz Bozkurt - Muhtar
 Kürşat Alnıaçık - Servet
 Tolga Tekin - Mesut
 Özgür Emre Yıldırım - Civan
 Hasan Yalnızoğlu - Leke
 Murat Kılıç - Hodja
 Gaye Gürsel - Psychologist
 Yiğit Kirazcı - Yakup
 Tuğçe Karabacak - Özlem
 Cansu Dağdelen - Aysel
 Tuncay Beyazıt - Turan

References

External links 
 
 

2020s Turkish television series
2021 Turkish television series debuts
Turkish comedy television series
Turkish-language Netflix original programming
Television shows set in Istanbul
Television series produced in Istanbul